Surveys of victims of crime have been undertaken in many cities and countries, using a common methodology to aid comparability, and have generally included questions on sexual violence. The United Nations has conducted extensive surveys to determine the level of sexual violence in different societies. According to these studies, the percentage of women reporting having been a victim of sexual assault ranges from less than 2% in places such as La Paz, Bolivia (1.4%), Gaborone, Botswana (0.8%), Beijing, China (1.6%), and Manila, Philippines (0.3%), to 5% or more in Istanbul, Turkey (6.0%), Buenos Aires, Argentina (5.8%), Rio de Janeiro, Brazil (8.0%), and Bogota, Colombia (5.0%).

No distinction has been made in these figures between rape by strangers and that by intimate partners. Surveys that fail to make this distinction or those that only examine rape by strangers usually underestimate substantially the prevalence of sexual violence.

Apart from crime surveys, there have been a small number of surveys, with representative samples, that have asked women about sexual violence. For instance, in a national survey conducted in the United States of America, 14.8% of women over 17 years of age reported having been raped in their lifetime (with an additional 2.8% having experienced attempted rape) and 0.3% of the sample reported having been raped in the previous year. A survey of a representative sample of women aged 18– 49 years in three provinces of South Africa found that in the previous year 1.3% of women had been forced, physically or by means of verbal threats, to have non-consensual sex. In a survey of a representative sample of the general population over 15 years of age in the Czech Republic, 11.6% of women reported forced sexual contact in their lifetime, 3.4% reporting that this had occurred more than once. The most common form of contact was forced vaginal intercourse.

Sexual violence by intimate partners

Forced sexual initiation
A growing number of studies, particularly from sub-Saharan Africa, indicate that the first sexual experience of girls is sometimes unwanted and forced. In a case control study, for example, of 191 adolescent girls (mean age 16.3 years) attending an antenatal clinic in Cape Town, South Africa, and 353 non pregnant adolescents matched for age and neighborhood
or school, 31.9% of the study cases and 18.1% of the controls reported that force was used during their sexual initiation. When asked about the consequences of refusing sex, 77.9% of the study cases and 72.1% of the controls said that they feared being beaten if they refused to have sex.

Forced sexual initiation and coercion during adolescence have been reported in many studies of young women and men. Where studies have included both men and women in the sample, the prevalence of reported rape or sexual coercion has been higher among the women than the men. For example, nearly half of the sexually active adolescent women in a multi-country study in the Caribbean reported that their first sexual intercourse was forced, compared with one-third of the adolescent men. In Lima, Peru, the percentage of young women reporting forced sexual initiation was almost four times that reported by the young men (40% against 11%, respectively).

There are not many studies of forced sexual initiation in the United States, and estimates from the studies that do exist vary widely. One study of 5,663 heterosexual women in the United States found that 12.5% had experienced forced sexual initiation. Of the women who were 15 years old or younger when they had their first sexual experience, 22% reported that those initiations were forced. In the 1992 US National Health and Social Life Survey of over 3,400 adults, more than 4% of women reported coerced sexual initiation.

In a study of over 24,000 women, the World Health Organization found the following rates of women reporting forced sexual initiation: 30% in a Bangladesh province, 24% in a Bangladesh city, 24% in a Peru province, 17% in an Ethiopia province, 17% in a United Republic of Tanzania province, 14% in a United Republic of Tanzania city, 8% in Samoa, 7% in a Peru city, 6% in a Namibia city, 5% in a Brazil province, 4% in a Thailand city, 3% in a Brazil city, 0.7% in a Serbia and Montenegro city, and 0.4% in a Japan city. In all of these sites except Ethiopia, the younger the woman was at the time of her first sexual experience, the more likely it was that that experience was forced sexual initiation.

Gang rape

Gang rape, or mass rape, occurs when a group of people participate in the rape of a single victim. Rape involving at least two or more perpetrators is widely reported to occur in many parts of the world.

Sexual trafficking

Each year hundreds of thousands of women and girls throughout the world are bought and sold into prostitution or sexual slavery. Internationally, the most common destinations for victims of human trafficking are Thailand, Japan, Israel, Belgium, the Netherlands, Germany, Italy, Turkey and the United States, according to a report by the United Nations Office on Drugs and Crime (UNODC).

Research in Kyrgyzstan has estimated that around 4,000 people were trafficked from the country in 1999, with the principal destinations being China, Germany, Kazakhstan, the Russian Federation, Turkey and the United Arab Emirates. Of those trafficked, 62% reported being forced to work without pay, while over 50% reported being physically abused or tortured by their employers.

A World Organization against Torture (OMCT) report suggested that more than 200,000 Bangladeshi women had been trafficked between 1990 and 1997. Over 200,000 Nepali girls have been trafficked to red light areas of India, and trafficking of Thai women to Japan has also been reported. Trafficking of women also takes place internally within some countries, often from rural areas to cities.

In recent years, the problem of human trafficking has gotten very serious in Europe, where women from Eastern Europe, as well as from Asia, Africa and Latin America are trafficked to Western Europe. In Netherlands, it is estimated that there are from 1,000 to 7,000 trafficking victims a year. Most police investigations relate to legal sex businesses, with all sectors of prostitution being well represented, but with window brothels being particularly overrepresented.

 In 2008, there were 809 registered trafficking victims, 763 were women and at least 60 percent of them were forced to work in the sex industry. All victims from Hungary were female and were forced into prostitution.

Out of all Amsterdam's 8,000 to 11,000 prostitutes, more than 75% are from Eastern Europe, Africa and Asia, according to a former prostitute who produced a report about the sex trade in Amsterdam, in 2008. An article in Le Monde in 1997 found that 80% of prostitutes in the Netherlands were foreigners and 70% had no immigration papers. In 2020, investigative journalists from Argos and Lost in Europe, found that the Dutch government had known for over five years that Vietnamese children go missing from protected shelters in The Netherlands, sparking fears of trafficking. In 2015, Argos stated, four Vietnamese girls went missing from a shelter, carrying brown suitcases of the same brand, 'a lot of cash and phones without sim cards.' Two of the minors carried 'sexy lingerie' in their suitcases.

In Germany, the trafficking of women from Eastern Europe is often organized by people from that same region. The German Federal Police Office (BKA) reported in 2006 a total of 357 completed investigations of human trafficking, with 775 victims. Thirty-five percent of the suspects were Germans born in Germany and 8% were German citizens born outside of Germany.

North America is also an important destination for international trafficking. A study undertaken under the auspices of the United States Central Intelligence Agency estimated that 45,000 to 50,000 women and children are trafficked annually to the United States. Over 150 cases of trafficking were prosecuted between 1996 and 1999 by the United States Department of Justice. In 2004, the Royal Canadian Mounted Police (RCMP) estimated that 600-800 persons are trafficked into Canada annually and that additional 1,500-2,200 persons are trafficked through Canada into the United States.
In Canada, foreign trafficking for prostitution is estimated to be worth $400 million annually.

Sexual violence against sex workers
Whether trafficked or not, sex workers are at high risk for both physical and sexual violence, particularly where sex work is illegal. A survey of female sex workers in Leeds, England, and Glasgow and Edinburgh, Scotland, revealed that 30% had been slapped, punched or kicked by a client while working, 13% had been beaten, 11% had been raped and 22% had experienced an attempted rape. Only 34% of those who had suffered violence at the hands of a client reported it to police.

A survey of sex workers in Bangladesh revealed that 49% of the women had been raped and 59% beaten by police in the previous year; the men reported much lower levels of violence. In Ethiopia, a study of sex workers also found high rates of physical and sexual violence from clients, especially against the child sex workers.

Stalking 
Stalking victimization involves a pattern of harassing or threatening tactics used by a perpetrator that is both unwanted and causes fear or safety concerns in the victim.   According to the CDC's The National Intimate Partner and Sexual Violence Survey from 2015, 1 in 6 women in the U.S were a victim of stalking at one point in her lifetime. The survey also found that about 1 in 17 men were victims of stalking at some point in their lives.

Sexual violence in schools, health care settings, armed conflicts, prisons, and refugee settings

Schools
For many young women, the most common place where sexual coercion and harassment are experienced is in school. In an extreme case of violence in 1991, 71 teenage girls were raped by their classmates and 19 others were killed at a boarding school in Meru, Kenya. While much of the research in this field comes from Africa, it is not clear whether this reflects a particularly high prevalence of the problem or simply the fact that the problem has had a greater visibility there than in other parts of the world.

Harassment of girls by boys is in all likelihood a global problem. In Canada, for example, 23% of girls had experienced sexual harassment while attending school.

The research done in Africa, however, has highlighted the role of teachers there in facilitating or perpetrating sexual coercion. A report by Africa Rights found cases of schoolteachers attempting to gain sex, in return for good grades or for not failing pupils, in the Democratic Republic of the Congo, Ghana, Nigeria, Somalia, South Africa, Sudan, Zambia and Zimbabwe. A recent national survey in South Africa that included questions about experience of rape before the age of 15 years found that schoolteachers were responsible for 32% of disclosed child rapes. In Zimbabwe, a retrospective study of reported cases of child sexual abuse over an 8-year period (1990 to 1997) found high rates of sexual abuse committed by teachers in rural primary schools. Many of the victims were girls between 11 and 13 years of age and penetrative sex was the most prevalent type of sexual abuse.

Health care settings
Sexual violence against patients in health facilities has been reported in many places. A study of physicians disciplined for sexual offences in the United States, for instance, found that the number of cases had increased from 42 in 1989 to 147 in 1996, with the proportion of all disciplinary action that was sex-related rising from 2.1% to 4.4% over the same period. This increase, though, could reflect a greater readiness to lodge complaints.

Other documented forms of sexual violence against female patients include the involvement of medical staff in the practice of clitoridectomy in Egypt, forced gynecological examinations and the threat of forced abortions in China, and inspections of virginity in Turkey. Sexual violence is part of the broader problem of violence against women patients perpetrated by health workers that has been reported in a large number of countries and until recently has been much neglected. Sexual harassment of female nurses by male doctors has also been reported.

Armed conflicts and refugee settings

Rape has been used as a strategy in many conflicts, including in Korea during the Second World War and in Bangladesh during the war of independence, as well as in a range of armed conflicts such as those in Algeria, India (Kashmir), Indonesia, Liberia, Rwanda and Uganda. In some armed conflicts, for example, the ones in Rwanda and the states of the former Yugoslavia rape has been used as a deliberate strategy to subvert community bonds and thus the perceived enemy, and furthermore as a tool of ethnic cleansing.

In East Timor, there were reports of extensive sexual violence against women by the Indonesian military. A study in Monrovia, Liberia, found that women under 25 years were more likely than those aged 25 years and over to report experiencing attempted rape and sexual coercion during the conflict (18% compared with 4%). Women who were forced to cook for a warring faction were at significantly higher risk.

Another inevitable consequence of armed conflicts is the ensuing economic and social disruption which can force large numbers of people into prostitution, an observation that applies equally to the situation of refugees, whether they are fleeing armed conflicts or natural disasters such as floods, earthquakes or powerful storms.

Refugees fleeing conflicts and other threatening conditions are often at risk of rape in their new setting. Data from the Office of the United Nations High Commissioner for Refugees, for instance, indicated that among the boat people who fled Vietnam in the late 1970s and early 1980s, 39% of the women were abducted or raped by pirates while at sea, a figure that is likely to be an underestimate.

In many refugee camps as well, including those in Kenya and the United Republic of Tanzania, rape has been found to be a major problem.

By women
According to Lara Stemple, Andrew Flores, and Ilan H Meyer, when, in the United States, counting cases where the victim is made to penetrate the perpetrator against their will, Women and men suffer from non-consensual sex at similar rates. 68.6% of men report female perpetrators. This doesn't show up in the Center for Disease Control's rape statistics, because they define rape as being penetrated against one's own will. Men are more likely to be made to penetrate someone else against their will than they are to be penetrated against their will. 79.2% of men who are made to penetrate someone else against their will report female perpetrators.

Customary forms of sexual violence

Child marriage

Marriage is often used to legitimize a range of forms of sexual violence against women. The custom of marrying off young children, particularly girls, is found in many parts of the world. This practice is legal in many countries and is a form of sexual violence, since the children involved are unable to give or withhold their consent. The majority of them know little or nothing about sex
before they are married. They therefore frequently fear it and their first sexual encounters are
often forced.

Early marriage is most common in Africa and South Asia, though it also occurs in the Middle East and parts of Latin America and Eastern Europe. In Ethiopia and parts of West Africa, for instance, marriage at the age of 7 or 8 years is not uncommon. In Nigeria, the mean age at first
marriage is 17 years, but in the Kebbi State of northern Nigeria, the average age at first marriage is just over 11 years. High rates of child
marriage have also been reported in the Democratic Republic of the Congo, Mali, Niger and Uganda.

In South Asia, child marriage is especially common in rural areas, but exists also in urban areas. In Nepal, the average age at first marriage is 19 years. Seven per cent of girls, though, are married before the age of 10 years, and 40% by the age of 15 years. In India, the median age at first marriage for women is 16.4 years. A survey of 5000 women in the Indian state of Rajasthan found that 56% of the women had
married before the age of 15 years, and of these, 17% were married before they were 10 years old. Another survey, conducted in the state of Madhya Pradesh, found that 14% of girls were married between the ages of 10 and 14 years.

Elsewhere, in Latin America for instance, early age at first marriage has been reported in Cuba, Guatemala, Honduras, Mexico and Paraguay. In North America and Western Europe, less than 5% of marriages involve girls younger than 19 years of age (for example, 1% in Canada,
Switzerland and the United Kingdom, 2% in Belgium and Germany, 3% in Spain, and 4% in the United States.

Other customs leading to violence
In many places, there are customs other than child marriage that result in sexual violence towards women. In Zimbabwe, for instance, there is the custom of ngozi, whereby a girl can be given to a family as compensation for a death of a man caused by a member of the girl's family. On reaching puberty the girl is expected to have sexual intercourse with the brother or father of the deceased person, so as to produce a son to replace the one who died. Another custom is chimutsa mapfiwa, according to which, when a married woman dies, her sister is obliged to replace her in the matrimonial home. Widow inheritance is or was practised by many cultures; when a man died, his widow was forced to marry one of his brothers.

See also
 Sexual violence in the Democratic Republic of the Congo
 Sexual violence in Papua New Guinea
 Sexual violence in South Africa

References

Rape
Sexual violence